Antonio "Tony" Terry (born March 12, 1964) is an American soul/new jack swing singer from Washington, D.C., who had several R&B hits in the late 1980s and early 1990s.

Biography

Singing
Terry is a graduate at the Duke Ellington School of the Arts in Washington. He landed backing vocalist jobs for the freestyle/pop group Sweet Sensation, and hip-hop group The Boogie Boys. In 1987, he signed a recording contract with Epic/CBS Records. Terry's first single, "She's Fly", was released the same year, and peaked at number 10 on the Billboard R&B singles chart. Forever Yours, Terry's debut album for Epic, was released in 1988, and reached the top 40 of Billboard'''s R&B albums chart. The follow-up single, "Lovey Dovey", reached number four on the R&B charts, and "Forever Yours" climbed into the R&B top 20. In 1989, Tony was also featured in a duet with label mate Flame on the song "On the Strength", which reached number 59 on the Billboard R&B singles chart and number 11 on the Billboard Dance/Club Play chart.

Terry's self-titled second album, released in 1990, included the single "With You" (his biggest hit), which reached the top 20 of the U.S. Billboard Hot 100, as well as the top 10 on the R&B chart. "Everlasting Love", was a number-six R&B hit. After leaving Epic, Terry moved over to Virgin Records. His debut album for that label was 1994's Heart of a Man. The single, "When a Man Cries", reached Billboards R&B top 40. The following year, Terry contributed background vocals on the single "Gotta Have Love", from Yolanda Adams's album More Than a Melody. He also appeared in the video. Terry has performed on the soundtracks to Gladiator starring Cuba Gooding, Jr., Tap starring Gregory Hines and King's Ransom starring Anthony Anderson. In 1991, Terry earned two Soul Train Music Award nominations: Single of the Year and Artist of the Year for "With You".

His video for "With You" was executive produced by Anita Baker and directed by Blair Underwood, who made a cameo appearance.

Terry, is slated to release a new project in 2017, I Tony 6, was released in 2015 on Spectra's Monarchy Records.

Acting
Terry was featured in Sisterella, co-produced by Michael Jackson; Mama, I Want to Sing' David E. Talbert's His Woman, His Wife, co-starring Stephanie Mills; and more recently the national tour of Tall Dark and Handsome. He also undertook The Wiz National Tour as the Tin Man. Terry toured in the stage production Cheezecake Boyz and the Diva. Terry was also seen in Lavarious A. Slaughter's, Love Unbreakable'', which began its national tour in February 2012 and is currently starring in Black Nativity at Crossroads Theatre in New Brunswick N.J.

Discography

Albums

Singles

See also
List of new jack swing artists
List of 1990s one-hit wonders in the United States
Hi-top fade

References

External links
EMGtalent.com

1964 births
Living people
People from Pinehurst, North Carolina
Singers from North Carolina
American rhythm and blues musicians
21st-century African-American male singers
20th-century African-American male singers